Günter Krings (born 7 August 1969) is a German lawyer and politician of the Christian Democratic Union (CDU) who has been serving as a member of the Bundestag from the state of North Rhine-Westphalia since 2002. 

In addition to his parliamentary work, Krings also served as Parliamentary State Secretary at the Federal Ministry of the Interior in the government of Chancellor Angela Merkel from 2013 until 2021.

Political career 
Krings first became a member of the Bundestag in the 2002 German federal election. In his first term from 2002 until 2005, he served on the Committee on Legal Affairs. From 2006 until 2009, he chaired the Parliamentary Advisory Board on Sustainable Development. 

From 2009 until 2013, Krings served as deputy chairman of the CDU/CSU parliamentary group, under the leadership of chairman Volker Kauder. In this capacity, he coordinated the group's legislative activities on consumer protection, domestic affairs, sports, and minorities. He was also a member of the Committee on the Election of Judges (Wahlausschuss), which is in charge of appointing judges to the Federal Constitutional Court of Germany. In 2012, he helped steer through parliament legislation on a so-called ancillary copyright for press publishers.

In the negotiations to form a Grand Coalition of Merkel’s Christian Democrats (CDU together with the Bavarian CSU) and the Social Democrats (SPD) following the 2013 federal elections, Krings was part of the CDU/CSU delegation in the working group on internal and legal affairs, led by Hans-Peter Friedrich and Thomas Oppermann. 

Krings served as Parliamentary State Secretary at the Federal Ministry of the Interior, under successive ministers Thomas de Maizière (2013–2018) and Horst Seehofer (2018–2021).

Since 2017, Krings has been leading the Bundestag group of CDU parliamentarians from North Rhine-Westphalia, the largest delegation within the CDU/CSU parliamentary group. In the negotiations to form a fourth coalition government under the leadership of Chancellor Angela Merkel following the 2017 federal elections, he was part of the working group on internal and legal affairs, led by Thomas de Maizière, Stephan Mayer and Heiko Maas.

Since the 2021 elections, Krings has been serving on the Committee on Legal Affairs again. Since 2022, he has also been serving on the parliamentary body in charge of appointing judges to the Highest Courts of Justice, namely the Federal Court of Justice (BGH), the Federal Administrative Court (BVerwG), the Federal Fiscal Court (BFH), the Federal Labour Court (BAG), and the Federal Social Court (BSG).

In the negotiations to form a coalition government of the CDU and Green Party under Minister-President of North Rhine-Westphalia Hendrik Wüst following the 2022 state elections, Krings and Lutz Lienenkämper led their party’s delegation in the working group on finances; their counterparts from the Green Party were Felix Banaszak and Sven Giegold.

Other activities
 Stiftung Forum Recht, Member of the Board of Trustees (since 2022)
 Association of German Foundations, Member of the Parliamentary Advisory Board 
 German Foundation for World Population (DSW), Member of the Parliamentary Advisory Board (–2021)
 International Association of Legislation (IAL), Member of the Advisory Council

Political positions
In June 2017, Krings voted against Germany's introduction of same-sex marriage.

Ahead of the Christian Democrats’ leadership election in 2018, Krings publicly endorsed Jens Spahn to succeed Angela Merkel as the party’s chair. For the 2021 national elections, he later endorsed Armin Laschet as the Christian Democrats' joint candidate to succeed Merkel as chancellor.

References

External links 

  
 Bundestag biography 

1969 births
Living people
Members of the Bundestag for North Rhine-Westphalia
Members of the Bundestag 2021–2025
Members of the Bundestag 2017–2021
Members of the Bundestag 2013–2017
Members of the Bundestag 2009–2013
Members of the Bundestag 2005–2009
Members of the Bundestag 2002–2005
Parliamentary State Secretaries of Germany
Members of the Bundestag for the Christian Democratic Union of Germany